The Couldn't Stand the Weather Tour was a worldwide concert tour by blues rock band Stevie Ray Vaughan and Double Trouble. Produced in support of their 1984 album Couldn't Stand the Weather, the tour visited North America, Europe, Australasia and Japan from 1984 to 1985. To reflect the new musical direction that the group took with Couldn't Stand the Weather, the tour was aimed to differ from their past and surpass expectations of the band. In comparison to Vaughan and Double Trouble's modest stage setup from the previous Texas Flood Tour, the Couldn't Stand the Weather Tour involved a slightly more elaborate production. It utilized grander amplifier setups and sound systems to take advantage of the larger venues in which they performed. To avoid their renowned strictly blues material, Vaughan and Double Trouble embodied a more expanded and varied repertoire during performances. In disparity to the previous tour, each of the Couldn't Stand the Weather shows opened with mostly the same three songs before other material was played. The album and the tour were the beginnings of the group's mid-eighties musical development.

Consisting of twelve legs and 145 shows, the tour commenced in Southampton, New York, on March 10, 1984, and concluded in San Antonio, Texas, on May 4, 1985. The first seven legs alternated between North America and Europe, before the following leg took the band to Carnegie Hall. After this leg, the tour's schedule was expanded for concert halls in Oceania, which was branded "First Tour of Australia", accordingly. Despite a variety of reactions from music critics, the tour received mostly positive reviews. Among other top-grossing concerts on the tour, nearly all of the Australian performances were sold-out over its seven-show period. The band's 1985 album Soul to Soul, which saw the addition of a fourth band member, was recorded during breaks in the tour, and its songs were played during the succeeding Soul to Soul Tour. By many accounts, the Couldn't Stand the Weather Tour was regarded as one of the band's busiest tours—in 1997, drummer Chris Layton recalled "at that point in time, it was like delirium seemed to be setting in".

Background 
Stevie Ray Vaughan and Double Trouble's debut album Texas Flood and the supporting Texas Flood Tour brought them to commercial and critical success, particularly in the United States and Europe. Like their other tours, the Texas Flood Tour was a basic, minimalist production, and they used this outlet to focus on musical and instrumentation aspects. As a result, the band warranted a renowned strictly blues repertoire, a reputation that became an obstacle of reluctance after their critically acclaimed cover version of the Jimi Hendrix song, "Voodoo Child (Slight Return)", which captured Vaughan's exploration of Hendrix. The band was pressured to remain pure to the blues and "steer clear of Jimi". Their 1983 Texas Flood Tour featured several Hendrix compositions in their setlist, and during a break in the tour, drummer Chris Layton recalled that "It came down to this question: are we going to move forward and push things to the limit, or are we going to cater to the purists and do straight blues shuffles?", encouraging progress for the group.

Planning, itinerary, and ticketing 
Before the tour began, a showcase took place on March 6, 1984, at the Sheraton Waikiki Hotel in Honolulu. Vaughan found it increasingly challenging to recreate all the sounds from the newly recorded album. They attempted using additional musicians, but their sentimental attachment to a three-piece prevailed for the time being.

On March 8, the band departed Austin for the Northeast to begin the tour. The tour's opening night took place on March 10, 1984, at Southampton College in Southampton, New York. Unlike the group's previous tour, which began immediately after the release of Texas Flood, the tour started two months before Couldn't Stand the Weather was released, allowing fans to familiarize themselves with the new songs. By opening night, Texas Flood had already sold over 300,000 copies in the US and 50,000 in Canada. For the opening two legs, 17 concerts in the US and Scandinavia were scheduled. Four days after the tour's beginning, tickets for the Scotia, New York show were sold out. The third leg of the tour, consisting of 23 shows in the US, took place from April to May 1984. On April 29, 1984, the band played Buffalo, NY for the 2nd time and this is when Stevie was given the Hamiltone (also known as "Main" or the "Couldn't Stand the Weather" guitar) it was a custom Stratocaster-style guitar made for Vaughan by James Hamilton in Buffalo, NY. It was presented to Vaughan by James as a gift from ZZ Top's Billy Gibbons. In very few cases, slow ticket sales led to canceled shows. Due to a promotional slump, a concert scheduled at Dickinson College in Carlisle, Pennsylvania was canceled. However, larger concerts all around the US opening for Huey Lewis and the News on their sold-out 1984–85 world tour helped to increase the tour's profits.

Two additional legs were immediately scheduled and just as, if not more, successful as the previous leg: the North American legs from June–August 1984, the European leg in August 1984, the US leg in September 1984, and the US "Fall Foliage" leg from September–October 1984. While playing other venues motivated the band, Vaughan and Double Trouble saw their Carnegie Hall appearance as an opportunity to show fans an expanded musical lineup, imagining the special aspects that would be used in such a historic space. Rehearsals for Carnegie Hall began at the Third Coast soundstage in Austin, in September 1984; a public rehearsal show was held on September 29 at the Caravan of Dreams in Fort Worth. Technical and dress rehearsals were incorporated into preparing for the show. Days before the show, the group canceled a Union, New Jersey concert, due to a final rehearsal that was scheduled in New York. By the time the concert began, the group had sold all 2,200 tickets.

The following leg, which began in late October, was the band's first full tour of Oceania and marked the first time they had visited the area. Scheduling for the year-end leg in California in late November afforded the band off-time between legs than the previous tour, but this amplified the exhaustion and delirium that had set in by the tour's end.

Recording and release of Soul to Soul 

Vaughan and Double Trouble recorded their next album, Soul to Soul, from March to May 1985 during breaks in the final two legs of the tour. The album was intended to be recorded in a month, but soon expanded into three months. Recording could not be completed before the final leg started, and for the first two weeks of the Soul to Soul sessions, the band wasted much time in the studio, recording until the early morning. Shannon called the sessions "a pretty strange time", while Layton said of it, "It was a bad combination–the long haul, we were all becoming really, really exhausted, but we kept ourselves propped up by doing more drugs." Shannon also said their substance abuse began to take its toll on the band. The album was ultimately released on September 30, 1985. Inspired by the additional musicians featured on select dates on the tour, Soul to Soul was an even greater divergence in style from their earlier recordings, incorporating organ and piano from newly hired band member Reese Wynans. A number of songs from the forthcoming album were included in the final two legs, most frequently early versions of "Say What!" and "Come On (Part III)". An early instrumental version of "Life Without You" was also added to the encore.

Critical response 
Many critics published favorable reviews about the tour; The Lakeland Ledger said that the band didn't disappoint, relying on "their music and themselves to entertain". The News & Observer wrote, "The crowd was still shouting for more when Vaughan unstrapped his guitar and said good night." Others praised the Carnegie Hall show; Stephen Holden of The New York Times acknowledged that Vaughan's talents were "handsomely displayed" and "filled with verve". The Dallas Times Herald said that "it was on the slow, bluesy stuff that the Carnegie Hall sound really helped", despite the fact that the hall's "fabled acoustics [didn't] seem to work so well for rock 'n' roll". The Age praised the Australian leg and assured readers that "none of the publicity is exaggerated". It observed that Vaughan was the "complete master of his instruments" and did it with a "minimum of fuss or flash". The Press wrote about the show in Christchurch, "There must be something about coming from the Lone Star State. The Austin, Texas guitarist turned in a virtuoso performance. ...Vaughan and the band showed they could play with a vengeance, notably in 'Love Struck Baby' and 'Pride and Joy,' both highlights of the concert."

Some critics indicated faults in the band's live mix. At the July 2 show in Saint Paul, Minnesota, the Dallas Times Herald noted that the acoustics in the room were awful, and the sound system provided was faulty. After the show, Vaughan said, "I'm sorry anybody had to see that. Those people out there deserved better." The review went on to say that "the fans jammed as close to the stage as they could get, trying to get a better look at his hands, trying to figure out where the magic was coming from". The Age said that Vaughan's voice was mixed back too far for much of it to be heard, "especially on the louder material".

Typical Setlist 

 "Scuttle Buttin'"
 "Voodoo Child (Slight Return)" (The Jimi Hendrix Experience cover)
 "Testify" (The Isley Brothers cover)
 "The Things (That) I Used to Do" (Guitar Slim cover)
 "Mary Had a Little Lamb" (traditional cover)
 "Tin Pan Alley" (Bob Geddins cover)
 "Love Struck Baby"
 "Cold Shot"
 "Couldn't Stand the Weather"
 "Pride and Joy"
 "Texas Flood" (Larry Davis cover)
 "Rude Mood"
 "Lenny"

Tour dates

Notes

References 
 
 
 
 
 
 
 
 
 
 
 
 
 

Stevie Ray Vaughan concert tours
1984 concert tours
1985 concert tours